The Suleymaniye Mosque is a mosque at Kingsland Road in Haggerston, East London, United Kingdom, which serves the entire Muslim community as well as the Turkish speaking community.  The mosque was funded by the UK Turkish Islamic Cultural Centre (UKTICC) and the construction began in 1994 and was finally opened to the public in October 1999. With a total floor space of 8,000 square metres, the total capacity of its Ottoman style mosque is 3,000 people.

The mosque includes a conference and wedding hall, classrooms, funeral service facilities as well as accommodation for Marathon School students.

Suleymaniye Mosque has become something of a local landmark and it is one of London's key Islamic centres.

Prince Charles visited the mosque in 2001.

See also 
Aziziye Mosque (London)
Islam in London
Islam in the United Kingdom
Shacklewell Lane Mosque
Süleymaniye Mosque in Istanbul
Turks in the United Kingdom

References

External links 
  

Ottoman mosques
Mosques in London
Mosques completed in 1999
Haggerston
Turkey–United Kingdom relations
1999 establishments in England